Burbidge is a surname. Notable people with the surname include:

 Frederick William Thomas Burbidge (1847–1905), English explorer and botanist 
 Geoffrey Burbidge (1925–2010), English astronomy professor
 George Burbidge (1847–1908), Canadian lawyer, judge and author
 John Burbidge (1718–1812), English soldier, land owner, judge and political figure in Nova Scotia
 Leslie William Burbidge (1891–??), English World War I flying ace
 Margaret Burbidge (1919–2020), British-born American astrophysicist
 Maurice "Moss" Burbidge (1896–1977), pioneering Canadian aviator
 Michael Francis Burbidge (born 1957), American Roman Catholic Bishop
 Nancy Tyson Burbidge (1912–1977), Australian systemic botanist
 Richard Burbidge (1847–1917), English merchant, 1st Baronet Burbidge

See also
 5490 Burbidge, an asteroid
 Burbidge baronets, a title in Great Britain
 Burridge (disambiguation)

Surnames
English-language surnames
Surnames of English origin
Surnames of British Isles origin